Dickey County is a county in the U.S. state of North Dakota. As of the 2020 census, the population was 4,999. Its county seat is Ellendale.

History
The Dakota Territory legislature created Dickey County on March 5, 1881, with territories annexed from McPherson County, South Dakota and Ransom County, North Dakota, with some previously unorganized territories added. Its governing structure was effected on August 18, 1882. It was named for a member of the Territorial Legislature, George H. Dickey.

Geography
Dickey County lies on the south side of North Dakota. Its south boundary line abuts the north boundary line of the state of South Dakota. The James River flows south-southeasterly through the east part of the county, and the Maple River flows south-southeasterly through the center part of the county. The county terrain consists of rolling hills, dotted with lakes and ponds in its western portion, with the area devoted to agriculture. The terrain slopes to the south and east, with its highest point being a hill near the southwestern corner at 2,139' (652m) ASL.

Major highways

  U.S. Highway 281
  North Dakota Highway 1
  North Dakota Highway 11
  North Dakota Highway 56

Adjacent counties

 LaMoure County - north
 Ransom County - northeast
 Sargent County - east
 Brown County, South Dakota - south
 McPherson County, South Dakota - southwest
 McIntosh County - west

National protected areas
 Dakota Lake National Wildlife Refuge
 Maple River National Wildlife Refuge

Lakes
 Hilles Lake
 Pheasant Lake

Demographics

2000 census
As of the 2000 census, there were 5,757 people, 2,283 households, and 1,499 families in the county. The population density was 5 people per square mile (2/km2). There were 2,656 housing units at an average density of 2 per square mile (1/km2). The racial makeup of the county was 97.78% White, 0.10% Black or African American, 0.35% Native American, 0.50% Asian, 0.56% from other races, and 0.71% from two or more races. 1.35% of the population were Hispanic or Latino of any race. 48.9% were of German, 14.7% Norwegian, 6.7% American and 6.0% Irish ancestry. 92.3% spoke English, 5.7% German and 1.5% Spanish as their first language.

There were 2,283 households, out of which 27.90% had children under the age of 18 living with them, 58.00% were married couples living together, 4.90% had a female householder with no husband present, and 34.30% were non-families. 32.00% of all households were made up of individuals, and 17.60% had someone living alone who was 65 years of age or older.  The average household size was 2.36 and the average family size was 2.99.

The county population contained 23.80% under the age of 18, 10.20% from 18 to 24, 22.50% from 25 to 44, 22.20% from 45 to 64, and 21.30% who were 65 years of age or older. The median age was 41 years. For every 100 females there were 97.20 males. For every 100 females age 18 and over, there were 92.50 males.

The median income for a household in the county was $29,231, and the median income for a family was $36,682. Males had a median income of $26,914 versus $15,668 for females. The per capita income for the county was $15,846. About 11.60% of families and 14.80% of the population were below the poverty line, including 20.40% of those under age 18 and 10.80% of those age 65 or over.

2010 census
As of the 2010 census, there were 5,289 people, 2,180 households, and 1,379 families in the county. The racial makeup of the county was 96.5% white, 0.7% black or African American, 0.6% American Indian, 0.4% Asian, 0.5% from other races, and 1.2% from two or more races. Those of Hispanic or Latino origin made up 1.9% of the population. In terms of ancestry, 56.3% were German, 16.9% were Norwegian, 11.4% were Irish, 7.4% were Swedish, 5.1% were Russian, and 1.1% were American.

Of the 2,180 households, 26.5% had children under the age of 18 living with them, 56.0% were married couples living together, 4.4% had a female householder with no husband present, 36.7% were non-families, and 33.3% of all households were made up of individuals. The average household size was 2.29 and the average family size was 2.94. The median age was 43.0 years.

The median income for a household in the county was $37,179 and the median income for a family was $53,333. Males had a median income of $36,029 versus $25,625 for females. The per capita income for the county was $21,824. About 6.8% of families and 11.0% of the population were below the poverty line, including 9.3% of those under age 18 and 18.2% of those age 65 or over.

Communities

Cities

 Ellendale (county seat)
 Forbes
 Fullerton
 Monango
 Ludden
 Oakes

Unincorporated communities

 Glover
 Guelph
 Merricourt
 Silverleaf
 Wirch

Townships

 Ada
 Albertha
 Albion
 Bear Creek
 Clement
 Divide
 Elden
 Ellendale
 Elm
 German
 Grand Valley
 Hamburg
 Hudson
 James River Valley
 Kent
 Kentner
 Keystone
 Lorraine
 Lovell
 Maple
 Northwest
 Port Emma
 Porter
 Potsdam
 Riverdale
 Spring Valley
 Valley
 Van Meter
 Whitestone
 Wright
 Yorktown
 Young

Politics
Dickey County voters are traditionally Republican-leaning. In only one national election since 1936 has the county selected the Democratic Party candidate (as of 2016).

See also
 National Register of Historic Places listings in Dickey County, North Dakota

References

External links
 Dickey County map, North Dakota DOT

 
1882 establishments in Dakota Territory
Populated places established in 1882